Salman Iqbal is a Pakistani media businessman and media mogul. He became the CEO of ARY Digital Network in 2014 after the death of Abdul Razzak Yaqoob. In addition, Iqbal is the owner of the ARY Group, that was started by his Uncle Abdul Razzak Yaqoob and publisher of the Newsweek Middle East.

He is the owner of the PSL team Karachi Kings. In 2017, he was listed among The 500 Most Influential Muslims.

Awards

References

Businesspeople from Dubai
Pakistani businesspeople
Pakistani expatriates in the United Arab Emirates
People from Karachi
Memon people
Pakistani people of Gujarati descent
Pakistan Super League franchise owners
Pakistani mass media owners
University of Houston alumni
Recipients of Sitara-i-Imtiaz